We Are What We Pretend To Be: The First and Last Works, is a book by Kurt Vonnegut. Published posthumously in 2013, it contains two novellas that were previously unpublished: Basic Training and If God Were Alive Today. It also contains some reminiscences and commentary by his daughter Nanette. The book's title comes from the preface of the 1966 edition of his novel Mother Night: "We are what we pretend to be, so we must be careful about what we pretend to be."

Basic Training is his first novella (apparently written during the late 1940s), originally intended to be sold under the pseudonym "Mark Harvey."

If God Were Alive Today is his last novel, which was incomplete at the time of his death in 2007.

References

Books by Kurt Vonnegut
Books published posthumously